Buck Creek may refer to the following geographic features in the United States:

Settlements
Buck Creek, Indiana
Buck Creek, Kansas
Buck Creek, Missouri
Buck Creek, Wisconsin

Rivers
Alabama
Buck Creek (Cahaba River tributary)
Iowa
Buck Creek (Mississippi River)
Buck Creek (Pechman Creek tributary)
Michigan
Buck Creek (Kent County, Michigan), tributary of the Grand River
Missouri
Buck Creek (Black River)
Buck Creek (Cuivre River)
Buck Creek (Joachim Creek)
Buck Creek (Morgan County, Missouri)
Ohio
Buck Creek (Ohio), tributary of the Mad River
Oklahoma
Buck Creek (Kiamichi River tributary)
Oregon
Buck Creek (Rogue River tributary)
Pennsylvania
Buck Creek (Delaware River)